Mateu Alemany Font (born February 24, 1963) is a Spanish executive who since March 2021, occupies the position of director of football at FC Barcelona. Between 2000 and 2005 he was the president of Real Mallorca, and returned to occupy this role on January 15, 2009. Between 2017 and November 2019 he was a general director at Valencia CF.

Career path 

Alemany was born on 24 February 1963 in Andtrax, Mallorca. In 1985 he obtained a law degree from the University of the Balearic Islands; he later obtained a master's degree in Financial accounting.

In 1990 he was made Deputy Managing Director at RCD Mallorca. In 1993, under the presidency of Bartolomé Beltrán he became the Chief Executive Officer of the club.

During his period as CEO, the club experienced several institutional changes, such as the purchase of the club by Grupo Zeta and the arrival of Antonio Asensio as president.

Florentino Pérez won the elections for the presidency of Real Madrid in 2000, and offered Mateu Alemany the position of General Director of the club, which Alemany rejected. Alemany then proceeded to take over the presidency of Mallorca, replacing Guillem Reynés. During the presidenсy of Alemany, Mallorca achieved victory in the 2003 Copa del Rey final, with goals scored by Walter Pandiani and Samuel Eto'o.

Alemany arranged the purchase of Eto'o for a club record £4.4 million fee; Eto'o departed Mallorca as the club's all-time leading domestic league scorer (54 goals) when he signed for Barcelona in the summer of 2004 for a transfer fee of €24 million, after lengthy, three-way negotiations with Mallorca and Madrid. In 2005, Alemany left the presidency of the club, as Mallorca was on the brink of relegation, in spite of several player signings and the return of manager Héctor Cúper.

In 2007, he led an unsuccessful candidacy for the presidency of the Royal Spanish Football Federation. In 2009 Alemany returned to Mallorca as club president. He left the role in June 2010, and sold his shares in the club to Lorenzo Serra Ferrer.

On 27 March 2017, Mateu Alemany was named the Genral director of Valencia CF. On November 7, 2019, he was dismissed from the position.

On March 26, 2021, he took office as football director of FC Barcelona under the presidency of Joan Laporta. He is expected to leave the role on June 30, 2023.

References 

1963 births
Association football executives
Living people
20th-century Spanish lawyers
FC Barcelona non-playing staff
Spanish football chairmen and investors
RCD Mallorca
Valencia CF non-playing staff
University of the Balearic Islands alumni